Zdeno Chára (born 18 March 1977) is a Slovak former professional ice hockey defenceman. He played 24 seasons in the National Hockey League (NHL) for the New York Islanders, Ottawa Senators, Boston Bruins, and Washington Capitals between 1997 and 2022.

Chára served as the Bruins' captain for all of his fourteen seasons with the franchise, from 2006 to 2020. He won the Norris Trophy as the league's best defenseman in 2009, becoming the first Slovak player to do so, and the second European player after Nicklas Lidström. In 2011, 2013 and 2019 Chára captained the Bruins to the Stanley Cup Finals, winning in 2011. He is one of four European-born and raised captains to lead his team to the Stanley Cup championship, and the first to be born and trained in the Eastern Bloc. In 2022, Chára played in his 1,652nd NHL game, making him the league's all-time leader in games played by a defenseman.

Playing career

New York Islanders (1997–2001)
After being passed over in the 1995 draft, Chára was drafted in the third round, 56th overall, by the New York Islanders at the 1996 NHL Entry Draft. He would spend his first season in North America with the Western Hockey League (WHL)'s Prince George Cougars, who subsequently selected Chára in that year's CHL Import Draft. Chára spent four seasons with the Islanders organization, becoming a reliable, stay-at-home defender in a primarily defensive role. He earned a reputation as a tough player to play against – intimidating, physically strong and a punishing hitter who could, on occasion, fight. His physical strength also gave him a very hard slap shot, which seemed to improve each and every season, although Chára was never deployed in an offensive role as an Islander. Chára was traded to the Ottawa Senators during the 2001 NHL Entry Draft as part of a deal to acquire forward Alexei Yashin. At the time, it was believed the deal would vastly improve the Islanders, who were never a contending team when Chára played there. Chára was part of a package deal that included Bill Muckalt and the second overall pick from that year's draft, which the Senators used to select Jason Spezza. The Islanders initially had a trade in place to send Chára to the Boston Bruins in exchange for Jason Allison, but team ownership nixed the deal because it would have involved Dave Scatchard, who they did not want to trade because they "liked Dave Scatchard because he visited sick kids in the hospital."

Ottawa Senators (2001–2006)

The Senators knew from observation Chára would be a reliable defender, and were also aware he was growing into his body and improving his skills each year. However, Chára grew in ways that exceeded all expectations. In 2001–02, during his first year in Ottawa, he recorded new career highs in goals (10) and points (23) as he turned into a bona fide two-way defenceman. His powerful slapshot continued to improve, and Ottawa began to deploy him on the power play to use it, something the Islanders had rarely done. It resulted in four of Chára's goals being scored with the man advantage that season. The following year, in 2002–03, Chára began to blossom into an elite NHL defenceman. He posted new career highs with 30 assists and 39 points and became one of Ottawa's top two defenders, along with Wade Redden. He also earned his first NHL All-Star Game appearance, where he recorded the second-hardest shot behind Al MacInnis in the Skills Competition.

In 2003–04, Chára posted career bests with 16 goals and 41 points, and recorded the NHL's third highest plus-minus rating, behind Martin St. Louis and Marek Malík, culminating in his first James Norris Memorial Trophy nomination. Although he lost to Scott Niedermayer as the NHL's top defenceman, he joined Niedermayer on the NHL first All-Star team.

After the 2004–05 NHL lockout, in which Chára played in the Swedish Elitserien for Färjestad BK, he matched his previous NHL season's 16-goal total and tallied a career best 43 points, good enough for NHL second All-Star team honors. Following the season, Ottawa was faced with the possible loss of its two top defencemen – Chára and Redden – and finances dictated they could only sign one; the Senators opted for Redden.  As Chára did not come to terms on a new contract with Ottawa, he became an unrestricted free agent at the end of 2005–06. Choosing Redden over Chára proved to be a mistake, as Redden's performance declined whereas Chára became one of the league's top defensemen.

Boston Bruins (2006–2020)

Early years in Boston, Norris Trophy and the Stanley Cup
On 1 July 2006, the first day of the free agency period, Chára signed a five-year, $37.5 million contract with the Boston Bruins and was named the team's captain, a role left vacant since Joe Thornton's departure to San Jose during the 2005–06 season. Chára became only the third Slovak-born NHL player to become a team captain, after Peter Šťastný of the Quebec Nordiques and Stan Mikita (co-captain) of the Chicago Blackhawks. Chára was named to the 2007 NHL All-Star Game (his second appearance) in Dallas and scored two goals in a 12–9 Eastern Conference loss. Chára also won the hardest shot segment of the preceding Skills Competition, clocking a shot at 100.4 mph. While his season was a personal success for many of these reasons, the Bruins were in a rebuilding mode at the time, and the signing was questioned throughout the NHL, as Chára posted an uncharacteristic −21 plus-minus rating that season due to the Bruins' struggles. However, his 32 assists were a new career high.

In 2007–08, Chára was voted a starter in the 2008 NHL All-Star Game, the first time in his career he received such All-Star Game honours. He repeated as the winner of the hardest shot competition, recording an even-faster 103.1 mph (166 km/h) on the radar gun. On 8 March 2008, during a game against the Washington Capitals, Chára suffered a torn labrum in his left shoulder. However, after missing five games, he played the remainder of the season, including the 2008 playoffs. Upon a first-round elimination at the hands of the Montreal Canadiens, he underwent a shoulder operation on 29 April. At the end of the season, Chára received his second nomination for the Norris Trophy after tallying a career-high 17 goals, 34 assists and 51 points, marking the fifth-straight season he had either matched or bested his previous season's points total. The Bruins improved tremendously this season, and the critics who had questioned the Bruins' signing of Chára the previous season were largely silenced by his, and the team's, improved play.

In 2008–09, Chára was named to his fourth All-Star Game. As back-to-back champion of the hardest shot competition, Chára initiated a charity drive among the participants ($1,000 per player) to go to the charity of choice of the competition's winner. The 2009 installation of the event featured additional intrigue, as three players widely considered to possess the hardest shots in the NHL (Chára, Sheldon Souray and Shea Weber) had all been chosen as All-Stars, and therefore would participate in the event. Having raised $24,000 from the six competitors and their respective teams, the NHL and the National Hockey League Players Association (NHLPA), Chára set a new Skills Competition record with a 105.4 mph (169.7 km/h) slapshot. He donated the winnings to Right to Play, and due to Chára's leading role in fundraising for charity, the hardest shot competition that year was punningly dubbed a "Chara"ty event. The shot passed Al Iafrate's previous record of 105.2 mph (169.3 km/h) from the 1993 competition. During the season, Chára posted a career best 19 goals and eclipsed his career best points total, reaching the 50-point plateau for the second consecutive year with a goal and an assist in his final game of the season. For his efforts, he won his first Norris Trophy as the NHL's best defenceman, edging Mike Green of the Washington Capitals and Nicklas Lidström of the Detroit Red Wings. Chára would post another standout season in 2009–10, scoring 44 points. His goal total fell to seven from the year before, but his play was as strong as ever, leading the Bruins to lock him up long-term with a contract extension; on 9 October 2010, he re-signed with the Bruins on a seven-year contract.

In 2010–11, Chára's 14 goals and 44 points were another strong campaign, leading to yet another All-Star selection and new heights as his slapshot continued to break records at the 2011 All-Star Game in Raleigh, North Carolina. He eclipsed his own previous record with a shot clocked at 105.9 mph (170.43 km/h). He also achieved a personal milestone that is exceptionally rare for a defenceman; on 17 January 2011, Chára recorded his first career hat-trick against the Carolina Hurricanes in a 7–0 victory. He celebrated the feat by performing retired Slovak NHL star Peter Bondra's celebration, where he mimed throwing a hat into the air. The 2010–11 season culminated in the ultimate glory for Chára, as he captained the Bruins to win the Stanley Cup against the Vancouver Canucks, the Boston team's first Stanley Cup championship win since 1972. In so doing, Chára became the first Slovak to captain a Stanley Cup champion, and only the second European to do so after Nicklas Lidström of Sweden for the Detroit Red Wings. He also became the first player born in a country behind the Iron Curtain to captain a Stanley Cup winner.

2011 Pacioretty incident
On 8 March 2011, Chára hit and drove Montreal Canadiens forward Max Pacioretty's head directly into an off-ice stanchion at the end of the bench, knocking him unconscious. Pacioretty was taken off the ice on a stretcher. The extent of the injury was revealed the next day to be a non-displaced fracture to the 4th vertebra and a severe concussion. For delivering the hit, Chára received a five-minute major penalty and a game misconduct, and videotape of the play was sent to NHL vice president of hockey operations Mike Murphy for review. However, Murphy decided no further punishment was warranted, calling it a "hockey play". Although a criminal investigation was announced by the Montreal Police Service immediately after the incident, the Crown Prosecutor Office announced on 17 November 2011, that Chára would not be criminally charged. Pacioretty eventually made a full recovery, returning to Montreal the following season. The following season the NHL tested and later mandated a change to its rinks to have a curved glass at the end of the player benches to deflect similar impact.

Final years in Boston
At the 2012 All-Star Game's Hardest Shot skill competition, Chára yet again raised his measured hardest slap shot velocity to another record, attaining 108.8 mph (175.1 km/h). Runner-up Shea Weber surpassed Chara's 2011 event record by recording a 106.0 mph blast in the same contest, but Chára's performance ensured he kept his title.

Chára is widely considered to have the hardest slapshot in the NHL, and quite possibly the world – the Kontinental Hockey League (KHL) claims the world record belongs to Alex Riazantsev at 114.1 mph, but due to differences in the mechanics of the KHL competition, the NHL does not recognize this figure. Chára won the hardest shot competition at the All-Star Game Skills Competition five times in a row, in 2007, 2008, 2009, 2011 and 2012 (Note: there was no NHL All-Star Game in 2010, due to NHL player participation in the 2010 Winter Olympics, and also in 2013 as a result of the 2012–13 NHL lockout). Chára played his 1,000th career NHL game on 24 March 2012 against the Los Angeles Kings, and it ended with a 4–2 victory for the Bruins.

During the 2012–13 NHL lockout, Chara agreed to play for Lev Praha of the KHL until NHL play resumed. He returned from the lockout to post another solid season, with 7 goals and 12 assists in the 48-game season. His point totals were down due to some of Boston's struggles down the stretch, particularly on the power play, where Chára only posted one assist all season despite plenty of ice time in man advantage situations. However, he remained solid on defence and a key contributor for the Bruins. In the 2013 playoffs, he was physically dominant and played a key role in leading his team to the Finals.

Following the 2013–14 season, Chára was named a finalist for the Norris Trophy. He was nominated along with eventual winner Duncan Keith and Shea Weber. Chára finished runner-up in the voting.

By the time the 2016–17 season had started, Chára was skating as part of the Bruins' top defensive pairing beside 6-foot-5-inch rookie defenceman Brandon Carlo, nearly 20 years younger than him. A similar "pairing" for Chára occurred as the 2017–18 season got going: the American-born star rookie defenceman Charlie McAvoy had, by mid-November of the new Bruins season, become Chára's latest "regular" defensive partner for the Bruins. By early February 2018, Chára played in his 1,400th NHL game in a 4–1 home ice defeat of the Toronto Maple Leafs, only the 39th player in NHL history to reach the milestone. On 28 March 2018, the Bruins re-signed Chára to a one-year, $5 million contract extension. On 17 April 2019, in game 4 of the first round series between the Bruins and Toronto Maple Leafs, Chára became the oldest defenceman in NHL history to score a game-winning goal in the Stanley Cup playoffs. On 9 June 2019, during game 6 of the 2019 Stanley Cup Finals against the St. Louis Blues, Chára scored an empty net goal and as a result became the oldest defenceman in NHL history to score a goal in the Stanley Cup Finals.

On 10 July 2019, following the retirement of Matt Cullen, Chára became the oldest active NHL player. On 5 November 2019, during a game at the Bell Centre against the Montreal Canadiens, Chára became the 21st player in NHL history to play 1,500 regular season games.

Washington Capitals (2020–2021)
On 30 December 2020, Chára signed a one-year, $795,000 contract with the Washington Capitals. He scored his first goal with the team on 28 January 2021, against the New York Islanders.

Return to the Islanders and retirement (2021–2022)
On 18 September 2021, it was announced that Chára had signed a one-year contract with the New York Islanders. On 24 February 2022, Chára played his 1,652nd NHL game, surpassing Chris Chelios' record of 1,651 games played by a defenceman. At the end of the season, he was a finalist for the Bill Masterton Memorial Trophy, awarded to the player who "best exemplifies the qualities of perseverance, sportsmanship and dedication to hockey".

On 20 September 2022, Chára announced his retirement from professional hockey. He signed a one-day contract with the Boston Bruins to officially retire as a member of the team.

International

Chára represented Slovakia in ten international tournaments, having played in the World Championships (1999, 2000, 2001, 2004, 2005, 2007, 2012) and the Olympics (2006, 2010, 2014). He won a World Championship silver medal in 2000, later captaining Slovakia to his second silver medal in 2012. He also competed in the 2004 World Cup of Hockey for Slovakia and the 2016 World Cup of Hockey for Team Europe.

During the 2014 Winter Olympics opening ceremony, Chára served as the flag bearer for Slovakia.

In 2020, Chára was named into the IIHF All-Time Slovakia Team.

Personal life
Before he was drafted into the NHL, Chára's coaches in his native Slovakia attempted to persuade him to play basketball, due to his height. Also as a result of his height, Chára uses 67-inch sticks (four inches longer than NHL regulations), and received a waiver from the NHL to do so.

Chára married his long-time girlfriend Tatiana Biskupicová on 14 July 2007, in a Catholic church in Nemšová, Slovakia. Tatiana gave birth to the couple's first child, daughter Elliz Victoria Chára (Chárová), on 27 April 2009. On 7 March 2016, Chára became a father to twin boys, Zack and Ben. All three of their children were born in Boston. His father, Zdeněk Chára, was a prominent Greco-Roman wrestler.

Chára is an athletic ambassador for Right To Play. In July 2008, he spent two weeks in Africa, visiting Mozambique in support of the charity, and climbing Mount Kilimanjaro with former NHL player Robyn Regehr.

Chára was one of the first NHL players to endorse You Can Play and acceptance of gay players in professional hockey.

Chára is a polyglot, speaking six languages outside of his native Slovak: Czech, Polish, Swedish, Russian, German, and English. He also has a financial planning diploma from Ottawa's Algonquin College. In early 2015, Chára received a license to sell real estate in the Commonwealth of Massachusetts.

Career statistics

Regular season and playoffs

International

Awards, honors and records

 Elected captain of Team Chara in the 2012 National Hockey League All-Star Game.
 The Hockey News, John Ferguson Award (Toughest Player) - 2013
 NHL All-Decade Second Team 2010–2019

Records
 First NHL player born in the Eastern Bloc to captain an NHL team to the Stanley Cup (2011).
 NHL All-Star Skills Competition hardest shot record – 108.8 mph (175.067 km/hr) (2012) (surpassed his previous record from 2011 at 105.9 mph, which surpassed a second previous record of his from 2009 at 105.4 mph)
Won the NHL All-Star Skills Competition hardest shot 5 times the most in NHL history.
 Most game 7 Playoff appearances in NHL history.
 Oldest defenceman in NHL history to score a game-winning goal in the Stanley Cup playoffs – 42 years and 30 days.
 Oldest defenceman in NHL history to score a goal in the Stanley Cup Finals – 42 years and 83 days.
 Most games played by a defenseman, in NHL history.

See also
 List of NHL players with 1,000 games played
 List of Slovaks in the NHL

Notes

References

External links

 
 
 
 
 

1977 births
Algonquin College alumni
Boston Bruins captains
Boston Bruins players
Färjestad BK players
HC Lev Praha players
HC Sparta Praha players
HK Dukla Trenčín players
Ice hockey players at the 2006 Winter Olympics
Ice hockey players at the 2010 Winter Olympics
Ice hockey players at the 2014 Winter Olympics
James Norris Memorial Trophy winners
Kentucky Thoroughblades players
Living people
Lowell Lock Monsters players
National Hockey League All-Stars
New York Islanders draft picks
New York Islanders players
Olympic ice hockey players of Slovakia
Ottawa Senators players
Prince George Cougars players
Slovak expatriate ice hockey players in Canada
Slovak expatriate ice hockey players in the United States
Slovak ice hockey defencemen
Sportspeople from Trenčín
Stanley Cup champions
ŠHK 37 Piešťany players
Washington Capitals players
Slovak expatriate ice hockey players in the Czech Republic
Slovak expatriate ice hockey players in Sweden